Mata Jai Kaur Public School is a private school in Ashok Vihar, Delhi, India. It was established in 1977 by Bhai Sahib Ditta Mal Ji in memory of his wife, Mata Jai Kaur Ji. It is managed by the Mata Jai Kaur Charitable Trust and affiliated to the Central Board of Secondary Education (CBSE).

"Shubh Karman Tey Kabhoo Na Taron" the school's motto means 'May I Never Deviate From Doing A  Good Deed'.

The school is spread across 4 acres of land and has been conferred the International School Award by British Council for the session 2015–18. It also has a sister school, Jaspal Kaur Public School, in Shalimar Bagh, Delhi.

Houses 
The school has 4 houses, named after Maharaja Ranjit Singh (M.R.S.), Bhai Vir Singh (B.V.S), Banda Singh Bahadur (B.S.B) and Hari Singh Nalwa (H.S.N). They are each headed by a house master.

Notable alumni 
 Taapsee Pannu, Bollywood Actress
 Vaani Kapoor, Bollywood Actress

References

External links 
 

Private schools in Delhi
Educational institutions established in 1977
1977 establishments in Delhi